Ruud Vormer (born 11 May 1988) is a Dutch professional footballer who plays as a central midfielder for Belgian First Division A side Zulte Waregem, on loan from Club Brugge.

Club career

Early career

Vormer started his professional career with AZ and made his debut for the club aged 18. Two year later he joined Roda JC. He then joined Feyenoord on a free transfer in the summer of 2012.

Club Brugge
Vormer joined Belgian side Club Brugge on 1 September 2014 on a three-year deal.

Vormer was named Club Brugge's player of the season during the 2015–16 campaign, featuring in 3,547 minutes or 69.1% of the club's play, and also contributed with seven goals and added a further six assists.

On 24 February 2017, Vormer scored twice in a 5–0 win over Zulte Waregem. He would go on to win the Belgian Golden Shoe in 2017. Vormer followed this up with a career best 13 league goals in the 2017–18 season, helping Club Brugge to a 15th Belgian First Division title. On 22 July 2018, Vormer signed a new contract with Club Brugge, keeping him at the club until 2022.

Vormer continued being an influential member for Club Brugge, contributing to their 17th league title success during the 2020–21 season and was named the club's player of the month for March 2021. Vormer signed a one-year contract extension on 14 June 2021, keeping him at the club until 2023.

Zulte Waregem 
On 3 January 2023, Vormer officially joined fellow Belgian side Zulte Waregem on a loan until the end of the season, with the deal set to become permanent once his contract with Club Brugge would expire.

International career
Vormer made his debut for the Netherlands national team in a 1–1 draw with Slovakia on 31 May 2018, coming on at half-time for Donny van de Beek.

Career statistics

Club

Honours
Club Brugge
Belgian Pro League: 2015–16, 2017–18, 2019–20, 2020–21, 2021–22
Belgian Cup: 2014–15
Belgian Super Cup: 2016, 2018, 2021, 2022

Individual
Belgian Golden Shoe: 2017
Club Brugge Player of the Season: 2015–16, 2016–17

References

External links
 Ruud Vormer at Voetbal International  – 

1988 births
Living people
People from Hoorn
Dutch footballers
Footballers from North Holland
Association football midfielders
Netherlands international footballers
AZ Alkmaar players
Roda JC Kerkrade players
Feyenoord players
Club Brugge KV players
S.V. Zulte Waregem players
Eredivisie players
Belgian Pro League players
Dutch expatriate footballers
Dutch expatriate sportspeople in Belgium
Expatriate footballers in Belgium